Hector Solis Flores (born September 2, 1985) is a Mexican entrepreneur and local celebrity.

Early years

Solis was born in Mexico City to Hector Solis and Milagro Flores. He moved from Mexico City to Guadalajara at the age of two. He studied at the Franco Mexicano where he learned French. This opened the doors to the world of celebrities and fashion. Thanks to his French, he studied in the ESCP where he met Zinedine Zidane who introduced him to the sports environment. He is now a partner of Gerardo Arturo González Sü.

External links
 Hattrick

Mexican businesspeople
Sports executives and administrators
1985 births
Living people
People from Mexico City